Jovica Škoro (born 12 December 1947) is a Serbian football manager and former player.

Playing career
After playing one season for Bečej in the Vojvodina League, Škoro joined Yugoslav Second League side Napredak Kruševac in 1969. He would spend the following decade at the club, becoming the club's all-time leading scorer. In total, Škoro netted 115 league goals in 240 appearances. He also helped the team win promotion to the Yugoslav First League on two occasions in 1976 and 1978. At the height of his career, Škoro scored a hat-trick in a memorable 4–0 friendly win over Tottenham Hotspur.

Managerial career
After hanging up his boots, Škoro served as manager of Napredak Kruševac on numerous occasions. He made his biggest accomplishments at the helm of Sartid Smederevo between October 2000 and April 2003, leading the team to a third-place finish in the 2001–02 season. Later on, Škoro was manager of Serbian SuperLiga clubs Jagodina (2011) and Metalac Gornji Milanovac (2011).

Career statistics

References

External links
 
 

Association football forwards
FK Jagodina managers
FK Metalac Gornji Milanovac managers
FK Napredak Kruševac managers
FK Napredak Kruševac players
FK Novi Pazar managers
FK Radnički Niš managers
FK Smederevo managers
Serbian football managers
Serbian footballers
Serbian SuperLiga managers
Sportspeople from Kikinda
Yugoslav First League players
Yugoslav footballers
Yugoslav Second League players
1947 births
Living people